Jiddu Krishnamurti or J. Krishnamurti, (12 May 189517 February 1986) was a writer and speaker on philosophical and spiritual issues including psychological revolution, the nature of the mind, meditation, human relationships, and bringing about positive social change. He came to early prominence thanks to claims, made on his behalf, that he was to be a Messiah. As a young man he repudiated these claims and declared himself unbound by any tradition or philosophy. He spent the rest of his life presenting a uniquely expressed philosophy of life around the world in talks, discussions, and writings.

About the works

Author biography 

Jiddu Krishnamurti was born 1895 in the town of Madanapalle in then-colonial India, to a family of middle class Telugu Brahmins. His father was associated with the Theosophical Society, and in the early part of the 20th century young Krishnamurti was promoted by the Adyar, India based leadership of the Society as the so-called World Teacher, a new messiah. However, in 1929 he disavowed this role, dissolved the worldwide organization (the Order of the Star) formed to support it, and shortly afterwards severed his ties to Theosophy and the Theosophical Society.

Denouncing the concept of saviors, spiritual leaders, and any other intermediaries to reality, Krishnamurti stressed the need for a revolution in the psyche of every human being. He posited that such revolution cannot be brought about by any external entity, be it religious, political, or social. He urged people to directly discover the underlying causes of the problems facing individuals and society, and stated that such discovery is the natural outcome of absolute and unconditional psychological freedom, which he declared as being within everyone's reach.

Krishnamurti set out to work towards this goal of universal psychological freedom, and until his death in 1986 traveled the world as an independent speaker, presenting his message to large and small groups and in discussion with interested individuals; a large number of these talks and discussions have been published in various formats and media. He also articulated his message in writing, authoring several books and other works.

Distribution and availability 
Official institutions

A number of successive non-profit institutions have been organized in order to preserve and disseminate Krishnamurti's work, originally by his Theosophist patrons, later by Krishnamurti and contemporary associates. , the latest incarnations of the official Krishnamurti-related entities are the Krishnamurti Foundations, organized in the late 1960s to early 1970s. Among other activities, the Foundations have continued, after his death, to publish new titles consisting of Krishnamurti's talks and writings, or new editions of older titles, in a variety of formats and media; a notable effort is the freely available online resource Jiddu Krishnamurti Online.

Availability

, according to one source, Krishnamurti-related materials numbered "2,412 works in 4,580 publications in 53 languages and 46,822 library holdings", while a trade concern stated, "His teachings of more than 20,000,000 words are published in more than 75 books, 700 audiocassettes, and 1200 videocassettes. Thus far, over 4,000,000 copies of books have been sold in twenty-two languages." Around the same time, Krishnamurti works in a variety of media were widely available through online and traditional retailers worldwide, in several different formats.

Listing of works

Works in print

Krishnamurti on Krishnamurti  
Krishnamurti rarely wrote (or spoke in public) about himself. In the following, he again usually refers to himself in third-person as noted above. However these works, being published diaries, are largely autobiographical.
 Krishnamurti's Notebook (1976). Published journal that Krishnamurti kept between June 1961 and March 1962. Also contains numerous (explicit and implicit) references to a state of consciousness Krishnamurti often called , among other designations.
 Krishnamurti's Journal (1982). A personal journal, that he started in 1973 and kept intermittently until 1975.
  Krishnamurti to Himself: his last journal (1987). Transcribed from audiotape recordings made at his home in the Ojai Valley between February 1983 and March 1984. Mary Lutyens, editor. M. Lutyens edited several of his books.

Pre-1933 works  
These works by Krishnamurti cover the years 1910 to 1933, which include his involvement with the Theosophical Society and with the various incarnations of the Order of the Star.
  At the Feet of the Master (1910). The author of this book may also be listed or co-listed (in different editions) as Alcyone, a pseudonym of Krishnamurti. However the identity of the author of works originally listed as authored by so-called Alcyone has been the subject of debate. Regardless of the extent of Krishnamurti's actual involvement, these works are considered Theosophical literature.
 Education as Service (1912). Another Alcyone book whose authorship has been questioned.
 "Lecture delivered at Benares on December 28th, 1921" (September 1922). A talk by Krishnamurti at the 1921 Theosophical Society Convention, which took place at Benares. Published in the Herald of the Star, then official bulletin of the Order of the Star in the East (a precursor organization of the Order of the Star).
 The Immortal Friend (1928). Poetry collection. Krishnamurti composed over 60 poems, published in the official bulletins of the Order of the Star, book collections of his poetry, and elsewhere.
 The pool of wisdom (1928).
 Life in Freedom (1928). Compiled from so-called campfire addresses given in Benares, Ojai, and Ommen, during the 1928 Star Camps. These were annual multi-day gatherings of members of the Order of the Star.
  "The Dissolution of the Order of the Star: A Statement by J. Krishnamurti" (September 1929). The speech by which Krishnamurti dissolved the Order of the Star. Originally delivered 3 August 1929 during the Ommen Star Camp, it was printed in its entirety in the Order's official magazine, the International Star Bulletin.
 The Dissolution of the Order of the Star: A Statement (1929). Krishnamurti's speech, listed above, was included in this special 14-page pamphlet published by the Star Publishing Trust. On the cover are the Order's founding and dissolution dates and places: "January 11, 1911 Benares Ommen August 3, 1929".
  "India's aspirations" (7 June 1930). Article in London's current affairs magazine The Nation and Atheneum with byline "by J. Krishnamurti; (The 'New World Teacher')". Pre-Indian independence, Krishnamurti applies his message to the "Indian problem" asserting, "The true enemy of freedom is dead tradition". The article was reprinted from the December 1929 issue of the International Star Bulletin.
 The Song of Life (1931). Poetry. The final collection of poems Krishnamurti published.
 Early Writings Series (1969–1972). Seven-volume series of early works by J. Krishnamurti. The series compiles material from 1927 to 1933, originally in bulletins, journals and pamphlets published by the Star Publishing Trust.
 From Darkness to Light (1980). Poetry, prose, and parables originally published between 1923 and 1931. Also subtitled "The Collected Works of Krishnamurti Volume One", this is completely different from the Collected Works Volume 1 listed below.

Post-1933 works 
 War abolished: One way to permanent peace (1943). Contains talks by Krishnamurti in Ojai and Pennsylvania during 1940. These were edited into chapter-based layout by "L.L.W." (L.L.Woolacott) and published as the second volume in Sydney-based Currawong Publishing's Unpopular Pamphlets series. Currawong was known as a publisher or licensee of anti-war pamphlets and books from a wide variety of authors, as well as of other works of political nature. During World War II Krishnamurti's stance was often construed as pacifism or subversion during a time of patriotic fervor, and for a time he came under surveillance by the FBI in the United States.
  Authentic report of sixteen talks given in 1945 & 1946 (1947). Publication of two series of talks at Ojai. With short preface by Krishnamurti. In these talks and others from 1944 Krishnamurti introduced concepts that eventually became regular aspects of his message.
 A new approach to living, The way of living, The way of peace (c. 1948). 16-page pamphlet contains transcripts of three talks broadcast from All India Radio at Madras and Bombay between 16 October 1947 and 3 April 1948, during a period of turmoil and change in India.
 The First and Last Freedom (1954). Includes a comprehensive foreword by Aldous Huxley.
  Commentaries on Living Series (1956–1960). A three-volume series subtitled "From the notebooks of J. Krishnamurti". The series editor was Rajagopal Desikacharya, at the time a close associate and friend of Krishnamurti.
 Series One (1956).
 Series Two (1958).
 Series Three (1960).
  This Matter of Culture (1964). Rajagopal Desikacharya, editor.
 Think on these Things (1970). Republication of This Matter of Culture with new title and publisher.
 Freedom from the Known (1969). Mary Lutyens, editor.
 The Only Revolution (1970). Mary Lutyens, editor.
 The Urgency of Change (1970). Mary Lutyens, editor. Book-length question and answer session, with questions posed by Alain Naude, Krishnamurti's personal secretary in the 1960s.
 Second Penguin Krishnamurti Reader (1973). This book compiles The Only Revolution and the Urgency of Change. Krishnamurti biographer Christine V. Williams was one of those who credited this mass market two-volume Penguin Reader series with introducing Krishnamurti and his work to a truly wide audience, and with helping to establish his reputation as a philosopher of note both with the general public and within intellectual circles. The first volume had been published in 1970.
 The Impossible Question (1972).
 You Are the World (1972). Subtitled, "Authentic Reports of Talks and Discussions in American Universities"at Brandeis University, University of California (Berkeley and Santa Cruz), and Stanford University in 1968 and 1969.
 The Awakening of Intelligence (1973). Cornelia and George Wingfield Digby, editors.
 Beyond Violence (1973). Consists of two series of talks (in Santa Monica, California, and London) and a single talk in Rome, Italy. All talks delivered during 1970.
 Meditations (1979). Compilation of quotes and writings on meditation. Evelyne Blau, editor.
 The Network of Thought (1982). Consists of talks at Saanen and Amsterdam, in July and September 1981. A commentator described this work: "Krishnamurti compares bad education with computer programming, in which minds are turned into biological and emotional machines to fit into preconceived patterns, or mental networks, for controlling social and political behavior. Self-observation without thought is the paradoxical way to break out of these networks."
 The Flame of Attention (1984).
 The Way of Intelligence (1985).
 Last Talks at Saanen, 1985 (1987). Krishnamurti spoke at annual meetings at Saanen, Switzerland, between 1961 and 1985. Krishnamurti biographer Pupul Jayakar wrote that these meetings became a focus for "serious ... people concerned with the enormous challenges to humankind".
  The Future Is Now: Last Talks in India (1988). Includes edited versions of Krishnamurti's last public talks, and also of discussions with Hindu and Buddhist scholars.
  Washington D.C. 1985 Talks (1988). Contains two talks delivered April 1985, his first ever in Washington, D.C., that are considered among the best (and best received) addresses by Krishnamurti who was then 90 years old. Both talks also included in the book Total Freedom: The Essential Krishnamurti and were published in video, see below.
  Total Freedom: The Essential Krishnamurti (1996). Introduction to Krishnamurti and selections from the breadth of his works, Mary Cadogan, Alan Kishbaugh, Mark Lee, and Ray McCoy editors.
  Krishnamurti: Reflections on the Self (1997). Raymond Martin, editor.
 To Be Human (2000). David Skitt, editor.
 The First Step is the Last Step (2004). From the title page: "Re-edited version of the talks first published in 1971 under the title Krishnamurti in India, 1970–71".
 Facing a World in Crisis (2005). David Skitt, editor.

Works on education 
Proper education was a major, lifelong concern of Krishnamurti. He and his associates established a number of schools during his lifetime, in an effort to apply his holistic educational philosophy. Although he was not involved in the daily running of the schools, Krishnamurti visited often, engaging teachers and students in talks and discussions. Starting in the 1970s, he also addressed a number of open Letters to Schools, which were later compiled in book form.
  Education and the Significance of Life (1953). One of several books containing Krishnamurti's educational ideas and concerns. This was the first Krishnamurti book to be published by a commercial publisher.
 Krishnamurti on Education (1974). Talks and discussions with students and teachers of the Krishnamurti Foundation India-affiliated Rishi Valley and Rajghat Besant schools.
  Beginnings of Learning (1975). Edited transcripts of Krishnamurti's discussions on education with students and staff at the Krishnamurti Foundation Trust (UK)-affiliated Brockwood Park School.
 "Intent of the Krishnamurti Schools" (1984). Statement by Krishnamurti distributed during his talks and discussions at Ojai, California in 1984. Later published in the Journal of the Krishnamurti Schools, an in-print and online publication of the Krishnamurti Foundation India. The Journal's articlesprimarily authored by teachers at Krishnamurti Schools around the world"broadly cover the areas of philosophy and practice in education."
  The whole movement of life is learning: J. Krishnamurti's letters to his schools (2007). Contains material that was originally published as Letters to Schools in two volumes (1981 and 1985). In addition, seventeen previously unpublished letters are included. Ray McCoy, editor.

Dialogues  
The following works are composed of Krishnamurti discussions with individuals or small groups, listed (in subheading) by the main counterpart's last name. In these often very informal discussions, Krishnamurti was able to expand on his message in a way not conducive to the more constrained talk format. He also used discussions to elaborate on subjects only minimally, or not at all, found elsewhere.

Allan W. Anderson
  A Wholly Different Way of Living (1991). A series of 18 conversations between Krishnamurti and Allan W. Anderson, Professor of Religious Studies at San Diego State University that took place in February 1974. Also available in audio and video formats, see section in this page.

 David Bohm 

Physicist David Bohm and Krishnamurti met in the early 1960s, and established a relationship that lasted until Krishnamurti's death. They examined their common concerns in a number of discussions; several have been published, in a variety of formats.
 Truth and Actuality: Part 1 (1977). Discussions at Brockwood Park, England, during May 1975. Cornelia and George Wingfield Digby, editors.
  The Ending of Time (1985). Edited versions of 13 conversations that took place in Ojai, California and Brockwood Park, England, during 1980. Also available in various video and audio formats.
 The Future of Humanity (1986). With foreword by David Bohm. These discussions, from June 1983, are also available on video.
 Limits of Thought (1999). Seven discussions from 1975, edited by Ray McCoy. In preface, Bohm presents "an introduction to Krishnamurti's work."

David Bohm and David Shainberg
  The Wholeness of Life: Part I (1978). Contains an abridgement of discussions between Krishnamurti, physicist David Bohm, and psychiatrist David Shainberg, held in 1976. Available on video as The Transformation of Man, see Audio and video resources below.
 The Transformation of Man (2004). Republication of The Wholeness of Life with different main title and publisher.

Fellows of the Los Alamos National Laboratory
 Krishnamurti at Los Alamos 1984 (1984). "In March 1984, Krishnamurti took part in a symposium at the National Laboratory Research Center at Los Alamos, New Mexico, on the subject of creativity in science. Also released on video. Included in the published symposium proceedings.

Pupul Jayakar, Mary Lutyens, Mary Zimbalist and Scott H. Forbes, etc.

Krishnamurti engaged in a number of public and private discussions with longtime close friend and associate, and official biographer Pupul Jayakar over several decades.

Krishnamurti also engaged in a number of private discussions on his early age with Emily Lutyens, mother of Mary Lutyens, and in private and public discussions with Mary herself, including Scott H. Forbes   - See Audio and video resources below.

He only asked two people to write about him: Mary Lutyens, who in fact she was his official biographer and he wanted her to record the whole of his life. Also, he wanted Mary Taylor- Zimbalist to write about what it was like to be with him, which she does using, as her source material, the daily dairies she kept for the 22 years she was with him. This work can also be found online after her initial but unfinished attempt to write a book, about what it was like to be with Krishnamurti. From this work, we know more about the daily life of Krishnamurti than any other famous person alive.

 Exploration into Insight (1991). Discussions with Jayakar and several others in India. When in India, Krishnamurti regularly held daily informal discussions with friends and associates that covered wide ranges of subjects; the discussions often explored and challenged his message in depth, a situation that stimulated him, according to another biographer.
  Fire in the Mind (1995). More discussions with Jayakar and others, held from the late 1960s to the mid-1980s, recorded and edited by Jayakar.

Walpola Rahula, et al.
 Can Humanity Change?: Part One (2003). Subtitled "J. Krishnamurti in dialogue with Buddhists", David Skitt, editor. Five discussions from the late 1970s with Buddhist scholar Walpola Rahula and Zen teacher Irmgard Schloegl. Other participants include physicist David Bohm, and author and scientist Phiroz Mehta.

Various counterparts: Iris Murdoch, Jonas Salk, etc.
 Questioning Krishnamurti (1996). Discussions and question-and-answer sessions with a variety of participants. Includes separate sessions with medical researcher Jonas Salk, writer and philosopher Iris Murdoch, physicist David Bohm, Buddhist scholar Walpola Rahula, associate Pupul Jayakar, journalist Bernard Levin, author and Professor of Religion Huston Smith, Tibetan Buddhism teacher Chogyam Trungpa Rinpoche, and others.

"Collected Works" series  
This series consists of previously published talks, discussions, question and answer sessions, and other writings, covering the period 1933–1967. Originally published as a stand-alone series of 17 volumes, it has become part of the much larger Complete Works of J. Krishnamurti: 1910–1986. , this undertakingalso referred to as the Complete Teachings Projectwas a continuing collaborative effort by the Krishnamurti Foundations; the objective being a cohesively edited collection of the entire body of Krishnamurti's works. It is estimated that the Complete Works would run to over 50 volumes of print media, and will be released in other formats, including online.
 Volume 1 (1933–1934): The Art of Listening (1991).
 Volume 2 (1934–1935): What Is the Right Action? (1991).
 Volume 3 (1936–1944): The Mirror of Relationship (1991).
 Volume 4 (1945–1948): The Observer Is the Observed (1991).
 Volume 5 (1948–1949): Choiceless Awareness (1991).
 Volume 6 (1949–1952): The Origin of Conflict (1991).
 Volume 7 (1952–1953): Tradition and Creativity (1991).
 Volume 8 (1953–1955): What Are You seeking? (1991).
 Volume 9 (1955–1956): The Answer is in the Problem (1991).
 Volume 10 (1956–1957): A Light to Yourself (1991).
 Volume 11 (1958–1960): Crisis in Consciousness (1991).
 Volume 12 (1961): There is No Thinker, Only Thought (1991).
 Volume 13 (1962–1963): A Psychological Revolution (1992).
 Volume 14 (1963–1964): The New Mind (1992).
 Volume 15 (1964–1965): The Dignity of Living (1992).
 Volume 16 (1965–1966): The Beauty of Death (1992).
 Volume 17 (1966–1967): Perennial Questions (1992).

Audio and video resources  
 "Film Clips: New York 1928, Ojai 1930" (1928/1930). Film clips of young Krishnamurti from uncredited original sources. First part [New York City 1928 according to the description] apparently part of newsreel. In the second part [described as having been filmed in Ojai, California in 1930], Krishnamurti reiterates the themes and language of the speech he gave dissolving the Order of the Star. Unofficial release.
 The Real Revolution (1966). The first full length talks of Krishnamurti recorded on video, from a series of talks and discussions in Ojai in 1966. These were edited into 30-minute programs for broadcast by non-commercial US television station WNDT.
  True Revolution (1969). Part of a series of talks at the University of California, Berkeley in February 1969, this talk was recorded on the 6th, and was released (in limited distribution) as a spoken word album by Pacifica Radio.
 A Wholly Different Way of Living (1974). A series of 18 conversations between Krishnamurti and Allan W. Anderson, Professor of Religious Studies at San Diego State University, originally recorded on audio and video tape in 1974. Also published in book form.
 The Transformation of Man (1976). Two conversations with physicist David Bohm and psychiatrist David Shainberg videotaped in 1976. Also published as part of the book The Wholeness of Life.
 The Ending of Time (1980). Published in a variety of audio and video formats, these eight discussions between physicist David Bohm and Krishnamurti took place in 1980, and were part of the raw material for the book with the same title.
 The Nature of Love (1982). Alternately titled Krishnamurti: On the Nature of Love. Videocassette recording, from a 1982 talk at Ojai, California.
 "Third Discussion with students at Rishi Valley, 1984" (1984). One of a series of discussions at the Rishi Valley School in 1984. In five parts. First two parts concern meditation, concentration, and attention. In the remaining parts Krishnamurti discusses conformity, corruption, and finding one's place in the world.
 Knowledge is conditioning (1984). First of three conversations videotaped between Krishnamurti and Mary Zimbalist, at Brockwood Park, UK.
 Thought and time are the cause of fear (1984)  Second of three conversations videotaped between Krishnamurti and Mary Zimbalist, at Brockwood Park, UK.
 Religion is an inquiry (1984)  Third of three conversations videotaped between Krishnamurti, Mary Zimbalist, and Ray McCoy, at Brockwood Park, UK.
 Why don't you listen? (1985). First of two small group discussions videotaped between Krishnamurti, Mary Zimbalist and Scott Forbes, at Brockwood Park, UK.
 Will Brockwood be a place where people come to listen to something very deep? (1985).  Second of two small group discussions videotaped between Krishnamurti, Mary Zimbalist and Scott Forbes, at Brockwood Park, UK.
 Washington Talks (1985). Also published in book form, see Washington D.C 1985 Talks.
 "Third Public Talk at Madras, 4 January 1986" (1986). Krishnamurti's last public talkhe died less than two months later. Uncredited original source. An edited transcript was published in the book The Future is Now. Unofficial release.

Other media 
 "The Core of the Teachings" (c. 1980). Webpage contains a pivotal Krishnamurti statement, also published in print. He broadly outlines and reaffirms his message, asserting in the opening sentence its unbroken continuity since the Dissolution of the Order of the Star. Krishnamurti originally composed it 21 October 1980, in response to a question by Mary Lutyens, who was at the time writing the second volume of his biography.
 The Krishnamurti Text Collection CD-ROM (1991). This Microsoft Windows-compatible CD-ROM includes the text collection of all of Krishnamurti's published works from 1933 to 1986, "whether in book, audio, or video form". It also includes, in the 1999 version, "70 additional transcripts not featured in previous versions."

See also 
List of works about Jiddu Krishnamurti

Notes and sources

Sources for notes  

Listed alphabetically by author or editor, else by title of work. Sub listed by date in ascending order.

Notes

Section: About the works

Section: Listing of works

References

External links  

 Official J. Krishnamurti inter-organizational website whose mission is  [emphasis in original]. An international joint venture of the Krishnamurti Foundations. Content provided in several languages. Includes search facility. 
 Krishnamurti-Related Papers Independent report of facts and opinions published by Reza Ganjavi who is not affiliated with any of the foundations.
 A multimedia project of the official Krishnamurti archival website J.Krishnamurti Online. Hosted videos require Adobe Flash. 
 A collaborative project of the Krishnamurti Foundations, "K Publications is responsible for publishing the written and digital work of J. Krishnamurti worldwide". 

Bibliographies by writer
Bibliographies of Indian writers
Bibliography